Giro or GIRO may refer to:

Banking and Investments
 Giro (banking), a direct payment from one bank account to another instigated by the payer
 Girobank, a state owned and later privatised financial institution in the UK 
 GiroBank, a Danish bank (1991–1995) which through several mergers is now part of Danske Bank
 name of a bank account with the Dutch Postgiro, later Postbank, now ING

People
 Ivelin Giro, Cuban American actress
 Jaume Giró (born 1964), Catalan corporate executive
 Giro (singer) stage name of salsa singer Jorge López
 Anna Girò, 18th-century Italian contralto
 Stefan Giro, Australian footballer

Places
 Giro, Indiana, a small town in the United States
 Giro District, Afghanistan

Other uses
 Girò, an Italian wine grape
 Giró blanc, a Spanish wine grape
 Giro d'Italia, a bicycling Grand Tour in Italy
 Giro d'Italia Femminile, a bicycling Grand Tour in Italy - Women's
 Giro d'Italia automobilistico, automobile race in Italy
 Giro (company), a U.S. manufacturer of helmets for cycling and snow sports
 Giro, or Girouette, a character in the video game Mega Man ZX
 Giro, a piece of orchestral music by Finnish composer Esa-Pekka Salonen

See also
 Gyro (disambiguation)